Sons is a 2006 Norwegian film focusing on the conflict between a pederast and the boys with whom he has had intimate relationships (his "sons"). It is Erik Richter Strand's first feature film as a director, and the feature-film debut of producer Eric Vogel and cinematographer Johan-Fredrik Bødker.

Plot
Lars (Nils Jørgen Kaalstad) is a 25-year-old man who is going nowhere in life. He is a lifeguard in a swimming hall in the eastern parts of Oslo (characterized by its lower middle class population). He is well-meaning, but he has a violent temper - the result of an unhappy, abuse-ridden childhood. His best friend Jørgen (Edward Schultheiss) is transitioning to adult life with his live-partner, Anja (Marika Enstad) and their children, but Lars is still living the bachelor's life, consisting mostly of drinking beer and playing soccer.

One day at a swimming pool, Lars recognizes Hans (Henrik Mestad), a middle-aged man with a reputation for "fiddling" with teenage boys in the neighborhood. Lars alerts Anja, the manager of the pool, that Hans is a menace who needs to be barred from the facilities. Anja says that Lars needs to get his life together and stop making uncorroborated accusations. When Lars meets Tim (Mikkel Bratt Silset), one of Hans' victims, he resolves to prevent the predator from harming any more children.

Cast 
 Nils Jørgen Kaalstad as Lars
 Mikkel Bratt Silset as Tim
 Edward Schultheiss as Jørgen
 Henrik Mestad as Hans
 Ingrid Bolsø Berdal as Norunn
 Anna Bache-Wiig as Heidi
 Ronnie Baraldsnes as Nyhetsanker
 Christin Borge as Dame i svømmehallen
 Terje Brevik as Prostitute's client
 Fredrik Stenberg Ditlev-Simonsen as Victim
 Marika Enstad as Anja
 Henrik Fjelldal as Roar
 Ane Hoel as Studio expert
 Lars Erik Holter as Man in Asker
 Jeppe Beck Laursen as Prostitute's client (billed as Jeppe Laursen)
 Fredrik Norrman as Torgeir
 Joachim Rafaelsen as Joakim

Reception 
The film received highly positive reviews from Norwegian film critics. Dagbladet'''s movie critic Inger Bentzrud gave the film a "die throw" of 5 out of 6, writing (translated from Norwegian): "The hunt for the molester takes place in a thriller-like race against the police. But still the film leaves a large room for reflection by providing such a multi-dimensional picture of the relationship between the perpetrator and the abused boys. As a debut work this shows both courage and social commitment".

On the webpages of TV 2, film critic Vibeke Johnsen gives the film 6 point (of 6 possible), and she wrote: "This is visionary and mainstream both at the same time. You are going to have to look around long for a film where script, direction, acting and credibility all click together as well. In other words, Sønner is a film you do not want to miss".Variety writes: "A hard-hitting and thoughtful drama about a young man's quest to expose a pedophile, Sons is an impressive first film by young Norwegian writer-director Erik Richter Strand [...]. Intense semi-thriller maintains interest without slipping into cliche, and has an ending both satisfying and unexpected".Sons'' had its international premiere at the San Sebastian Film Festival in Spain; since then, it has been featured in more than 20 film festivals worldwide. Among its numerous trophies the film has won the Fassbinder Award in Mannheim, Germany, and The Grand Jury Award at the Seattle International Film Festival in the USA.

References

External links 
  
 

2000s Norwegian-language films
2006 films
2006 drama films
Norwegian LGBT-related films
Norwegian vigilante films